Abdulla Goran (b. in 1904 in Halabja - died 1962 in Sulaymaniyah) was a leading Kurdish poet and translator of the 20th century.

Biography
Abdulla was born in Halabja in 1904 and received his education in local schools and the pedagogical institute in Kirkuk. As a teacher in Kirkuk, he continued his self-education by learning new languages and studying Turkish and Western literature. He took part in radical political and social causes in the 1930s and was frequently arrested until the 14 July Revolution in 1958. He spent much effort on creating a single Kurdish literary language by merging the two Kurdish dialects Kurmanji and Sorani. He was moreover a skilled translator and translated texts from English, French, Persian and Turkish to Kurdish. He died in 1962 in Sulaymaniyah.

Poetry 
Goran combined traditional Kurdish classical and folk verses with contemporary lyricism and diversified the subject matter. He introduced blank verse, prose poem, and new rhyme schemes and abandoned the aruz.

References 

Iraqi Kurdish people
People from Sulaymaniyah Province
Iraqi Kurdish poets
1904 births
1962 deaths
Halabja
Deaths from cancer in Iraq
Academic staff of the University of Baghdad
20th-century Iraqi poets